Dust Bowl is the ninth studio album by blues rock guitarist Joe Bonamassa. It was released worldwide on March 22, 2011. The cover art is based on a famous 1936 photograph by Arthur Rothstein.

Track listing

Personnel 

 Joe Bonamassa – guitars, vocals (all tracks); tzouras, baglama and slide bouzouki (tracks 2, 5); mandolin (track 10)
 Carmine Rojas – bass (tracks 1-2, 4-9, 12)
 Anton Fig – drums (tracks 1-2, 4-9, 12); percussion (tracks 2, 5); Hammer guitar (track 5); shaker (track 9)
 Rick Melick – organ (tracks 1-2, 4-8, 12); piano, tambourine (tracks 2, 5-7, 12); synthesizers (track 4), accordion (track 5)
 Peter Van Weelden – spoken word (track 2)
 John Hiatt – vocals (track 3)
 Vince Gill – guitar (tracks 3, 11); vocals (track 11)
 Michael Rhodes – bass (tracks 3, 10-11)
 Chad Cromwell – drums (tracks 3, 10-11)
 Steve Nathan – Hammond organ (track 3); piano (tracks 3, 11)
 Tony Cedras – trumpet (track 7)
 Glenn Hughes – vocals (track 8)
 Arlan Schierbaum – Hammond organ (track 9)
 Blondie Chaplin – guitar (track 9)
 Beth Hart – vocals (track 9)
 Reese Wynans – Hammond organ, piano (track 10)
 Kevin Shirley – production

Charts

Certifications

References 

Joe Bonamassa albums
2011 albums
Albums produced by Kevin Shirley